Alex McCalister (born October 17, 1993) is an American football outside linebacker who is a free agent. He played college football as a defensive end at the University of Florida from 2012 to 2015. He was selected in the seventh round of the 2016 NFL Draft by the Philadelphia Eagles.

College career
It was reported that McCalister was dismissed from the Florida Gators football team prior to the 2016 Citrus Bowl against Michigan; however, McCallister in reality never was dismissed and instead was merely injured. He declared for the 2016 NFL Draft as an early entrant.

Professional career

Philadelphia Eagles
McCalister was drafted by the Philadelphia Eagles in the seventh round, 240th overall, of the 2016 NFL Draft. On August 28, 2016, the Eagles placed McCalister on injured reserve with a calf strain.

On September 2, 2017, McCalister was waived by the Eagles. He was re-signed to the practice squad on October 10, 2017. He was released by the team on October 24, 2017.

Washington Redskins
McCalister was signed to the Washington Redskins' practice squad on December 12, 2017. He signed a reserve/future contract with the Redskins on January 1, 2018, but was waived on August 6.

Winnipeg Blue Bombers
McCalister signed with the Winnipeg Blue Bombers of the Canadian Football League on February 15, 2019, but was released during final roster cuts on June 9. He was re-signed to the team's active roster on August 20. He was released on June 1, 2021.

References

External links
Florida Gators bio

1993 births
Living people
Players of American football from Winston-Salem, North Carolina
American football defensive ends
Florida Gators football players
Philadelphia Eagles players
Washington Redskins players
Winnipeg Blue Bombers players